The 2010 South Australian state election elected members to the 52nd Parliament of South Australia on 20 March 2010. All seats in the House of Assembly or lower house, whose current members were elected at the 2006 election, and half the seats in the Legislative Council or upper house, last filled at the 2002 election, became vacant.

The incumbent centre-left Australian Labor Party government led by Premier Mike Rann was elected to a third four-year term over the opposition centre-right Liberal Party of Australia led by Leader of the Opposition Isobel Redmond. Labor's landslide 7.7 percent swing to a two-party-preferred vote of 56.8 percent at the 2006 election was reversed at this election with a swing of 8.4 percent, finishing with a two-party vote of 48.4 percent, however, Labor retained majority government with 26 of 47 seats, a net loss of two. Labor lost the inner metropolitan seats of Adelaide, Morialta and Norwood to the Liberals while Nationals SA member Karlene Maywald lost her rural seat of Chaffey to the Liberals. Independent Kris Hanna lost to the Labor candidate in Mitchell, independents Bob Such in Fisher and Geoff Brock in Frome retained their seats (the latter having won at the 2009 by-election), while independent candidate Don Pegler won Mount Gambier, replacing outgoing independent Rory McEwen. Jay Weatherill took over from Rann as Premier and Labor leader in October 2011.

In the upper house, both major parties won four seats each, with the last three to the SA Greens, Family First, and Dignity for Disability. The composition of the upper house therefore became eight Labor, seven Liberal, two Green, two Family First, two independent No Pokies, and one Dignity for Disability.

Like federal elections, South Australia has compulsory voting, uses full-preference instant-runoff voting in single member seats for the lower house and single transferable vote group voting tickets in the proportionally represented upper house. The election was conducted by the Electoral Commission of South Australia (ECSA), an independent body answerable to Parliament.

Results

House of Assembly

|}

Independents: Bob Such, Geoff Brock, Don Pegler

Seats changing hands

 *Figure is versus the Liberal Party. In the electoral district of Mount Gambier, the incumbent independent Rory McEwen did not re-contest his seat, and was expected to revert to the Liberal Party. However, another independent, Don Pegler, won the seat.
 In the electoral district of Frome, incumbent independent Geoff Brock retained his seat won at the 2009 Frome by-election, held at the 2006 election by former leader of the Liberal Party and former Premier, Rob Kerin.

Pendulum

The following Mackerras pendulum works by lining up all of the seats according to the percentage point margin post-election on a two-candidate-preferred basis. "Safe" seats require a swing of over 10 per cent to change, "fairly safe" seats require a swing of between 6 and 10 per cent, while "marginal" seats require a swing of less than 6 per cent.

Legislative Council

|}

Prior to the election, of 22 seats, Labor and the Liberals held eight seats each, Family First and No Pokies held two seats each, and the Greens and Democrat-turned-independent David Winderlich held one seat each. Up for election were five Liberal, four Labor, one Family First, and Winderlich. Labor and the Liberals won four seats each, with one each to Family First and the Greens, with the last spot to Dignity for Disability candidate Kelly Vincent. This gives an upper house composition of eight Labor, seven Liberal, two Greens, two Family First, two independent No Pokies, and one Dignity for Disability.

Campaign
Rann Labor opened the campaign by announcing the duplication (one-way to two-way) of the Southern Expressway, due to be completed by 2014. Additional specialist maths and science teachers for South Australian high schools were announced. Tens of thousands of extra training places and apprenticeships as part of a pledge to create 100,000 extra jobs during the next six years, despite a healthy economy, assisted by mining and defence industries, and the lowest state unemployment figures in the country.

Under Labor, the Royal Adelaide Hospital would be abandoned and a new hospital built on the site of the old rail yards, moving Adelaide's main hospital from the eastern end to the western end of North Terrace in the Central Business District, within the electoral district of Adelaide. The Liberals and minor party Save the RAH were campaigning against this, with the Liberals proposing renovations on the current site.

Australian Football League (AFL) games and other sporting events are expected to be moved away from AAMI Stadium to new grounds. The Liberals proposed a new sports stadium on the old rail yards, while Labor proposed a major overhaul of Adelaide Oval, also in the electoral district of Adelaide.

A large unfunded liability within the workers compensation scheme known as WorkCover had built up under both Labor and Liberal governments, which sparked sweeping payout reductions under the last term of the Rann Government, with the legislation passed in Parliament by both major parties, but came under sustained criticism from both the left and the right. The left were critical of monetary cuts to injured or otherwise incapable workers (see 2008 Parnell–Bressington filibuster), while the Liberals attacked WorkCover's operations, claiming there was wasteful duplication and a decrease in accountability, argued that this contributed to its budget problems, and that under a Liberal government WorkCover's insurance and regulatory arms would be split.

Attorney-General Michael Atkinson had been the subject of sustained criticism by the internet generation demographic for refusing to allow classification of and therefore legally allow certain types of explicit media (see Michael Atkinson#Media classification and censorship). Gamers 4 Croydon was created and contested Atkinson's seat of Croydon, as well as Adelaide, Norwood, Light, Mawson, and the upper house. Though the Liberals had not pledged a different stance on the issue, Atkinson suffered a larger than average primary swing of 16 points and two-party-preferred swing of 12 points in his seat. Following the election, Atkinson announced his immediate resignation from the Rann ministry, and that he would not recontest his seat at the next election. It was announced that the new Rann Labor Attorney General would be John Rau, who expressed that he held a different view to his predecessor, and would be talking with his interstate counterparts at the next meeting of Attorneys General.

The election campaign was overshadowed by affair allegations against Rann.

Although it was apparent only a few hours after the polls closed that Rann Labor had retained majority government, it was four days after the election that Rann officially claimed victory, after Redmond eventually conceded that the Liberals had not won enough seats to be capable of forming a government. The Governor of South Australia subsequently re-appointed Mike Rann as Premier of South Australia.

Labor retained government despite the Liberals winning a bare majority of the statewide two-party vote. The "fairness clause" in the state constitution was intended to ensure that the party winning the statewide two-party vote would win a majority of seats. On the boundaries drawn after the 2006 election, which were based on over a quarter-century of voting patterns, a uniform swing of 6.9 percent would have seen the Liberals take seven seats off Labor—on paper, enough to make Redmond South Australia's first female premier. However, despite suffering a swing of 8.4 percent, Labor only lost three seats, and only two of them—Morialta and Adelaide—saw swings of 6.9 percent or more. While 22 seats saw double-digit swings, Labor sat on insurmountably safe margins in 16 of them. Labor actually picked up swings in their favour in their two most marginal seats, Light and Mawson. The ABC's Antony Green observed that Labor lost votes in seats that would have stayed in Labor hands in any event, while holding onto its support in seats the Liberals needed to win government.

Additionally, the Liberals only won nine of the 34 metropolitan seats, though all three seats they took off Labor were in Adelaide. For most of the four decades since the end of the Playmander, South Australian politics have been characterised by an extreme urban-rural split. Under normal conditions, Labor wins the most seats in the capital, while most of the Liberal vote is packed into ultra-safe rural seats. The 2010 election was no different. While six of the Liberals' 13 safe seats were urban, all but one of their four marginal seats were urban. As was the case at the 1989 election, much of the Liberal majority was wasted on landslides in their rural heartland.

Candidates
See Candidates of the South Australian state election, 2010

Retiring

Liberal
 Graham Gunn MHA (Stuart)
 Liz Penfold MHA (Flinders)
 Robert Lawson MLC
 Caroline Schaefer MLC

Labor
 Lea Stevens MHA (Little Para)
 Trish White MHA (Taylor)

Other
 Rory McEwen MHA (Mount Gambier, Independent)

Polling 

Newspoll polling is conducted via random telephone number selection in city and country areas. Sampling sizes consist of just under 900 electors, with the 14–18 March 2010 poll consisting of just under 1600 electors. The declared margin of errors are ± 3.5 percent and ± 2.5 percent respectively.

Date
The last state election was held on 18 March 2006 to elect members for the House of Assembly and half of the members in the Legislative Council. In South Australia, section 28 of the Constitution Act 1934, as amended in 2001, directs that parliaments have fixed four-year terms, and elections must be held on the third Saturday in March every four years unless this date falls the day after Good Friday or occurs within the same month as a Commonwealth election, or the conduct of the election could be adversely affected by a state disaster. Section 28 also states that the Governor may also dissolve the Assembly and call an election for an earlier date if the Government has lost the confidence of the Assembly or a bill of special importance has been rejected by the Legislative Council. Section 41 states that both the Council and the Assembly may also be dissolved simultaneously if a deadlock occurs between them.

The election campaign must run for a minimum of 25 days or a maximum of 55 days, therefore the Governor would need to have issued writs for the election by 23 February 2010 at the latest. Between 7 and 10 days after that date, the electoral roll is closed, which gives voters a final opportunity to enrol or to notify the State Electoral Office of any changes in their place of residence. Candidates wishing to stand for election can nominate between the issue of the writs and no more than 14 days after the close of rolls for a deposit of $450.

The writs were issued 20 February, the electoral roll closed 2 March, and candidate nominations closed 5 March.

Previous Parliament

The centre-left Australian Labor Party, led by Premier Mike Rann, and the centre-right Liberal Party of Australia, led by Leader of the Opposition Isobel Redmond, are the two main parties in South Australia. In the 2006 state election, of 47 seats total, Labor won 28 seats, the Liberals won 15 seats and the Nationals, who are not in coalition with the Liberals in South Australia, retained their seat through minister Karlene Maywald (Chaffey). Three seats were retained by independents, minister Rory McEwen (Mount Gambier), Bob Such (Fisher) and Kris Hanna (Mitchell). Smaller parties which held no seats in the lower House but achieved significant votes in 2006 included the SA Greens and the Family First Party.

In the South Australian Legislative Council, the Labor Party and the Liberal Party held eight seats each, whilst No Pokies and Family First held two seats each. The SA Greens and an ex-Democrat independent held one seat each. Half of the upper house was up for election in 2010, four Labor and five Liberal, one Family First and one ex-Democrat independent.

No Pokies MP Nick Xenophon, re-elected in 2006 until 2014, was replaced by former No Pokies candidate John Darley after Xenophon's resignation to run for the Australian Senate at the 2007 federal election in which he was successful. Former Liberal MP Robert Brokenshire replaced Family First MP Andrew Evans as an MLC in 2008. The last remaining Democrats MP anywhere in Australia, Sandra Kanck, chose to resign before the end of her term, which prompted a party membership ballot to choose a replacement in early 2009. David Winderlich was selected. He resigned from the party in late 2009 to sit in parliament as an independent.

Former Liberal Premier Rob Kerin resigned in November 2008, which triggered a 2009 Frome by-election. Independent Geoff Brock won the seat, reducing the Liberals to 14 of 47 seats. A 2012 Ramsay by-election and a 2012 Port Adelaide by-election saw Labor retain both seats.

See also
 Rann Government
 Candidates of the South Australian state election, 2010
 Members of the South Australian House of Assembly, 2010–2014
 Members of the South Australian Legislative Council, 2010–2014
Previous election: 2006 South Australian state election
Next election: 2014 South Australian state election

External links
2010 South Australian election: Electoral Commission SA
2010 South Australian election: Antony Green - ABC
2010 South Australian election guide: The Poll Bludger
2010 South Australian election: Adelaide Now
Liberals confident as South Australia heads to the polls, 7:30 Report, 16 March 2010, Transcript - Video
The South Australian Election 2010: A Summary - by Dean Jaensch

References

2010 elections in Australia
Elections in South Australia
2010s in South Australia
March 2010 events in Australia